Grimpoteuthis umbellata, known from three specimens, is the type species of Grimpoteuthis.

Description and habitat

The species is not well known. The three specimens were taken from different locations; the largest was found off the Azores, and the smaller two were found off Morocco. Of the three specimens, only two were actually members of Grimpoteuthis. Only one of these two is still extant, and it is in poor condition. The largest was found at a depth of 2,235 meters. 

Grimpoteuthis umbellata could be the senior synonym of either Grimpoteuthis wuelkeri or Grimpoteuthis discoveryi.

The large specimen is 250 millimeters long, and its mantle is 46 millimeters long. Its first arm is 100 millimeters long. Each arm has between 65 and 68 suckers.

References

Octopuses
Molluscs described in 1883